The North Trinity Church near Nash, North Dakota is a church that was built in 1893.  It has also been known as Nordre Trefoldegheds Menigheds, as The Swede Church, and as North Trinity Lutheran Church.  It includes Gothic Revival architecture.  It was listed on the National Register of Historic Places in 2004 as "Nordre Trefoldegheds Menigheds".

It is a front-gabled building with a steeple.  It was built by carpenter Knut Staven.

References

Churches on the National Register of Historic Places in North Dakota
Gothic Revival church buildings in North Dakota
Churches completed in 1893
Lutheran churches in North Dakota
Swedish-American culture in North Dakota
National Register of Historic Places in Walsh County, North Dakota
1893 establishments in North Dakota